Sony Mobile Display Corporation was a subsidiary of Sony Corporation and produced Low-temperature polysilicon, amorphous silicon TFT LCD panels, organic EL displays and touch screens for use in mobile products such as camcorders, digital cameras, mobile phones, automobiles, etc. Its manufacturing plants were located in Higashiura, Aichi and Tottori, Tottori, Japan. The business of the company was transferred to  Japan Display Inc. on April 1, 2012.

History
On October 22, 1997, ST Liquid Crystal Display Corporation (STLCD), a 50:50 joint venture between Sony Corporation and Toyota Industries Corporation, was established in Higashiura, Aichi, Japan. On March 31, 2005, Sony and Toyota Industries acquired International Display Technology Corporation (IDTech) and renamed it to ST Mobile Display Corporation (STMD).

Recent history
On December 1, 2007, STLCD and STMD were merged to form Sony Mobile Display Corporation. On June 30, 2009, Epson and Sony agreed to transfer certain business assets relating to small-and medium-sized TFT LCD operations. On June 1, 2010, Sony Mobile Display sold the Yasu plant to Kyocera Corporation.

On August 31, 2011, Innovation Network Corporation of Japan (INCJ), Hitachi, Sony and Toshiba announced that Hitachi Displays, Sony Mobile Display and Toshiba Mobile Display will be merged to form a new company called Japan Display Inc. (INCJ 70%, Hitachi 10%, Sony 10%, Toshiba 10%).

On April 1, 2012, the company became a wholly owned subsidiary of Japan Display and renamed Japan Display West Inc.

On April 1, 2013, Japan Display West (formerly Sony Mobile Display), Japan Display Central (formerly Toshiba Mobile Display), and Japan Display East (formerly Hitachi Displays) were merged into Japan Display.

See also
 S-LCD
 Sony Group

References

External links 
 http://www.sony.net/SonyInfo/News/Press/201102/11-0202E/index.html
 http://www.sony.net/SonyInfo/News/Press/201003/10-040E/index.html
 http://www.sony.net/SonyInfo/News/Press/200906/09-0630E/index.html
 http://www.sony.net/SonyInfo/News/Press/200709/07-0926E/index.html
 http://www.sony.net/SonyInfo/News/Press/200503/05-018E/index.html
 http://www.sony.net/SonyInfo/News/Press/200501/05-0107E/index.html

Mobile Display
Display technology companies
Defunct companies of Japan
Electronics companies of Japan
Companies based in Aichi Prefecture
Electronics companies established in 1997
Electronics companies disestablished in 2012
Japanese companies established in 1997
Japanese companies disestablished in 2012